Truce of the Wolf and Other Tales of Old Italy is a collection of seven Italian stories retold for children by Mary Gould Davis. They include a legend about Saint Francis of Assisi and a story from the Decameron. Illustrated by Jay Van Everen, it was first published in 1931 and was a Newbery Honor recipient in 1932.

References

1931 short story collections
Children's short story collections
American children's books
Newbery Honor-winning works
1931 children's books